Bosk may refer to:

 Bosk or Baška, Košice-okolie District, a village and municipality in Kosice Region, Slovakia
 Bosk of Port Kar, a character in the Gor series by John Norman

See also
 Bosque, a type of gallery forest habitat
 Bosc (disambiguation)